The 1957 Arizona Wildcats football team represented the University of Arizona in the Border Conference during the 1957 NCAA University Division football season.  In their first season under head coach Ed Doherty, the Wildcats compiled a 1–8–1 record (0–4 against Border opponents) and were outscored by their opponents, 299 to 125. The team captains were Allen Polley and Jack Davis.  The team played its home games in Arizona Stadium in Tucson, Arizona.

The team's statistical leaders included Ralph Hunsaker with 717 passing yards, Tom Dunn with 341 rushing yards, and Gene Leek with 310 receiving yards.

Schedule

References

Arizona
Arizona Wildcats football seasons
Arizona Wildcats football